This is a list of communication protocols used for the automation of processes (industrial or otherwise), such as for building automation, power-system automation, automatic meter reading, and vehicular automation.

Process automation protocols
 AS-i – Actuator-sensor interface, a low level 2-wire bus establishing power and communications to basic digital and analog devices
BSAP – Bristol Standard Asynchronous Protocol, developed by Bristol Babcock Inc.
CC-Link Industrial Networks – Supported by the CLPA
CIP (Common Industrial Protocol) – can be treated as application layer common to DeviceNet, CompoNet, ControlNet and EtherNet/IP
ControlNet – an implementation of CIP, originally by Allen-Bradley
DeviceNet – an implementation of CIP, originally by Allen-Bradley
DF-1 - used by Allen-Bradley ControlLogix, CompactLogix, PLC-5, SLC-500, and MicroLogix class devices
DNP3 - a protocol used to communicate by industrial control and utility SCADA systems
DirectNet – Koyo / Automation Direct proprietary, yet documented PLC interface
EtherCAT
Ethernet Global Data (EGD) – GE Fanuc PLCs (see also SRTP)
EtherNet/IP – IP stands for "Industrial Protocol". An implementation of CIP, originally created by Rockwell Automation
Ethernet Powerlink – an open protocol managed by the Ethernet POWERLINK Standardization Group (EPSG).
FINS, Omron's protocol for communication over several networks, including ethernet.
FOUNDATION fieldbus – H1 & HSE
HART Protocol
HostLink Protocol, Omron's protocol for communication over serial links.
Interbus, Phoenix Contact's protocol for communication over serial links, now part of PROFINET IO
MECHATROLINK – open protocol originally developed by Yaskawa, supported by the MMA
MelsecNet, and MelsecNet II, /B, and /H,  supported by Mitsubishi Electric.
Modbus PEMEX
Modbus Plus
Modbus RTU or ASCII or TCP
OSGP – The Open Smart Grid Protocol, a widely use protocol for smart grid devices built on ISO/IEC 14908.1
OpenADR – Open Automated Demand Response; protocol to manage electricity consuming/controlling devices
Optomux – Serial (RS-422/485) network protocol originally developed by Opto 22 in 1982. The protocol was openly documented and over time used for industrial automation applications.
PieP – An Open Fieldbus Protocol
Profibus – by PROFIBUS & PROFINET International (PI)
PROFINET - by PROFIBUS & PROFINET International (PI)
RAPIEnet – Real-time Automation Protocols for Industrial Ethernet
Honeywell SDS – Smart Distributed System – Originally developed by Honeywell.  Currently supported by Holjeron.
SERCOS III, Ethernet-based version of SERCOS real-time interface standard
SERCOS interface, Open Protocol for hard real-time control of motion and I/O
GE SRTP – GE Fanuc PLCs
Sinec H1 – Siemens
SynqNet – Danaher
TTEthernet – TTTech
MPI – Multi Point Interface

Industrial control system protocols

MTConnect
Open Platform Communications, formerly OLE for process control
OPC Unified Architecture
Data Distribution Service from the Object Management Group

Building automation protocols

1-Wire – from Dallas/Maxim
BACnet – for Building Automation and Control networks, maintained by ASHRAE Committee SSPC 135.
BatiBUS - merged to KNX
C-Bus Clipsal Integrated Systems Main Proprietary Protocol
CC-Link Industrial Networks, supported by Mitsubishi Electric
DALI - Digital Addressable Lighting Interface specified in IEC 62386.
DSI -  Digital Serial Interface for the controlling of lighting in building, precursor to DALI.
Dynet -  lighting and automation control protocol developed in Sydney, Australia by the company Dynalite
EnOcean – Low Power Wireless protocol for energy harvesting and very lower power devices.
European Home Systems Protocol (EHS) - merged to KNX
European Installation Bus (EIB) named also Instabus - merged to KNX
INSTEON - SmartHome Labs Pro New 2-way Protocol based on Power-BUS.
KNX – Standard for building control.  Previously Batibus/EHS/EIB
LonTalk – protocol for LonWorks technology by Echelon Corporation
Modbus RTU or ASCII or TCP
oBIX - Open Building Information Exchange is a standard for RESTful Web Services-based interfaces to building control systems developed by OASIS.
UPB - 2-way Peer to Peer Protocol
VSCP - Very Simple Control Protocol is a free protocol with main focus on building- or home-automation 
xAP – Open protocol
X10 – Open standard for communication among electronic devices used for home automation (domotics)
Z-Wave - Wireless RF Protocol
Zigbee – Open protocol for Mesh Networks

Power system automation protocols

DNP3 – Distributed Network Protocol
IEC 60870-5
IEC 61850
IEC 62351 – Security for IEC 60870, 61850, DNP3 & ICCP protocols

Automatic meter reading protocols

ANSI C12.18
DLMS/IEC 62056
IEC 61107
M-Bus
OMS
Zigbee Smart Energy 2.0
Modbus
ANSI C12.21
ANSI C12.22

Automobile / Vehicle protocol buses
Controller Area Network (CAN) – an inexpensive low-speed serial bus for interconnecting automotive components
FlexRay – a general purpose high-speed protocol with safety-critical features
IDB-1394
IEBus
J1708  – RS-485 based SAE specification used in commercial vehicles, agriculture, and heavy equipment.
J1939 and ISO11783 – an adaptation of CAN for agricultural and commercial vehicles
Keyword Protocol 2000 (KWP2000) – a protocol for automotive diagnostic devices (runs either on a serial line or over CAN)
Local Interconnect Network (LIN) – a very low cost in-vehicle sub-network
Media Oriented Systems Transport (MOST) – a high-speed multimedia interface
Vehicle Area Network (VAN)
UAVCAN - a lightweight protocol for in-vehicle communication over CAN or Ethernet

See also

 Lists of network protocols
 Protocol converter
 Serial communication
 Vehicle bus

References

Industrial Ethernet
Control engineering
automation